Tony Gatlif (born as Michel Dahmani on 10 September 1948 in Algiers) is a French film director of Romani ethnicity who also works as a screenwriter, composer, actor, and producer.

Personal
Gatlif was born in Algeria of Pied noir ancestry. After his childhood there, Gatlif arrived in France in 1960 following the Algerian War of Independence.

Career
Gatlif struggled for years to break into the film industry, playing in several theatrical productions until directing his first film, La Tête en ruine, in 1975. He followed it with the 1979 La Terre au ventre, a story of the Algerian War of Independence.

Since the 1981 film Corre, gitano, Gatlif's work has been focused on the Romani people of Europe, from whom he partially traces his descent.

After making Gaspard et Robinson in 1990, Gatlif spent 1992 and 1993 shooting Latcho Drom, which was awarded numerous prizes. This feature-length musical film, often mislabelled as a documentary, deals with gypsy culture throughout the world around the theme of their music and dance. For Vincent Ostria, then journalist at the Cahiers du Cinéma, it was "the most genuine film of the year (1993 editor's note)." A year later, Gatlif brought the world of the author J. M. G. Le Clézio to the screen in Mondo (1994).

His 2004 film Exils, won the Best Director Award at the 2004 Cannes Film Festival. His film Transylvania also premiered at Cannes in May 2006.

Filmography

Screenwriter
 La Rage au poing (1975)

Director and screenwriter
 La Tête en ruine (1975)
 La Terre au ventre (1978)
 Corre gitano (1981)
 Canta gitano (1981)
 Les Princes (1982)
 Rue du départ (1985)
 Pleure pas my love (1989)
 Gaspard et Robinson (1990)
 Latcho Drom (1993)
 Mondo (1995)
 Gadjo dilo (1997)
 Je suis né d'une cigogne (1998)
 Vengo (2000)
 Swing (2001)
 Exils (2004)
 Transylvania (2006)
 Korkoro (2009)
 Indignados (2012)
 Geronimo (2014)
 Djam (2017)
 Tom Medina (2021)

References

 This article is based on a translation of the corresponding article from the French Wikipedia, retrieved on July 17, 2005.

External links
 
 Interview (in French)

1948 births
Living people
French film directors
Cannes Film Festival Award for Best Director winners
Georges Delerue Award winners
Algerian emigrants to France
French people of Kabyle descent
Romani film directors
French Romani people
People from Algiers
Kabyle people
French male stage actors
French male film actors
Romani in Algeria